The 2009 Ford 400 was the thirty-sixth and final stock car race of the 2009 NASCAR Sprint Cup Series as well as the tenth and final race of the season-ending Chase for the Sprint Cup. It was held on November 22, 2009, at Homestead-Miami Speedway, in Homestead, Florida, before a crowd of 70,000 people. The 267-lap race was won by Denny Hamlin of the Joe Gibbs Racing team after starting from thirty-eighth position. Richard Childress Racing driver Jeff Burton finished second and his teammate Kevin Harvick was third.

Going into the race only Hendrick Motorsports teammates Jimmie Johnson and Mark Martin remained in contention to win the Drivers' Championship, with Johnson leading Martin by 108 points. Johnson won the pole position by setting the fastest lap in qualifying, and he maintained his lead on the first lap of the race. Many Chase for the Sprint Cup participants, including Johnson, Kurt Busch and Mark Martin, were in the top ten for most of the race, although some encountered problems in the closing laps. Kyle Busch was leading the race with forty-six laps remaining, giving the lead to Hamlin on lap 223 who maintained it to win the race. There were seven cautions in the race, as well as eighteen lead changes among ten different drivers.

The race was Hamlin's fourth win in the 2009 season, and the eighth of his career. Johnson became the first driver to win four consecutive Drivers' Championships and was 141 points ahead of Mark Martin. Johnson's team owner Jeff Gordon won the Owners' Championship. Chevrolet won the Manufacturers' Championship with 262 points, fifty-five points ahead of Toyota and ninety-eight ahead of Ford. The race attracted 5.60 million television viewers.

Background 

The Ford 400 was the 36th and final race of the 2009 NASCAR Sprint Cup Series and the last of the ten-race season-ending Chase for the Sprint Cup. It was held on November 22, 2009, in Homestead, Florida, at Homestead Miami Speedway, an intermediate track that holds NASCAR races. The track's turns are banked from 18 to 20 degrees, and both the front stretch (the location of the finish line) and the back stretch are banked at three degrees.

Before the final race of the season, Jimmie Johnson led the Drivers' Championship with 6,492 points; Mark Martin was second with 6,384 points, 92 points behind Johnson. A maximum of 195 points were available for the final race. Johnson could win the title if he finished 25th or higher, while Martin had to win the race and for Johnson to place 30th. Behind Johnson and Martin in the Drivers' Championship, Jeff Gordon was third with 6,323, and Kurt Busch was fourth with 6,281 points. Gordon would be mathematically eliminated from winning the championship when the race commenced. Chevrolet had already secured the Manufacturer's Championship, and entered the race on 256 points, 58 points ahead of Toyota on 198 points, with a maximum of nine points available at the Ford 400. Carl Edwards was the race's defending champion.

In the title battle, Johnson had achieved seven wins, fifteen top-five finishes, and twenty-three top ten placings over the course of the season; he was vying to become the first driver to win four consecutive Cup Series championships while his teammate Martin would be the oldest driver to claim the title. Johnson commented on his mindset: "I am out of emotion, There is no emotion. It's all business. It's about showing up tomorrow, putting in the best lap I can, driving the car as hard as can I on Saturday, making sure the car is set up right, and doing my job on Sunday. I am not allowing my mind to slip any.” Martin said he had an unchanged mindset for each race in 2009 and was unworried about his championship prospects: "I'm sure that we could wind up fourth in the points, which is something no one has even considered. But I'm not thinking about that. I'm neither worried about that or Jimmie."

A total of 48 cars were entered for the event with two changes of driver. David Stremme, who had been replaced Brad Keselowski as the driver  Penske Championship Racing's  12 entry, signed to race the No. 9 Phoenix Racing car for the Ford 400. Matt Crafton drove the No. 7 Robby Gordon Motorsports vehicle during practice and qualifying in place of Robby Gordon, who was racing in the 2009 Baja 1000 (part of the SCORE International Off-Road Championship) in his attempt to win the Trophy Truck Division and overall championship titles.

Practice and qualifying 

Three practice sessions were held before the Sunday race—one on Friday, and two on Saturday. The first session lasted 90 minutes, and the second 45 minutes. The final session lasted 60 minutes. In the first practice session, Kurt Busch was fastest with a lap of 31.136 seconds, placing ahead of Juan Pablo Montoya in second and Clint Bowyer in third. Ryan Newman took fourth position and Joey Logano placed fifth. Tony Stewart, Edwards, Dale Earnhardt Jr., Kevin Harvick and David Reutimann rounded out the top ten fastest drivers in the session. Montoya lost control of his car exiting the fourth turn, and spun down the frontstretch but avoided sustaining damage to his vehicle.

A total of forty-eight drivers were entered in the qualifier on Friday afternoon; due to NASCAR's qualifying procedure, forty-three were allowed to race. Each driver ran two laps, with the starting order determined by the competitor's fastest times. Johnson clinched his fourth pole position of the season, with a time of 31.049 seconds that was recorded due to his qualifying late and track conditions improving. He was joined on the grid's front row by Scott Speed, his joint-highest qualifying starting position of his career. Marcos Ambrose qualified third and held second until Speed set his fastest lap. Martin took fourth when the circuit temperature was at its warmest and held the pole until Johnson's lap. Stewart started fifth. Harvick, Newman, Greg Biffle, Bill Elliott and Bowyer completed the top ten fastest qualifiers. Kurt Busch, one of the drivers in the Chase for the Sprint Cup, qualified twelfth, while Jeff Gordon set the twentieth fastest time. Terry Labonte in 43rd used a Champion's Provisional to qualify for the race. The five drivers who failed to qualify were Joe Nemechek, Dave Blaney, Mike Skinner, Max Papis and Stremme. Reed Sorenson, Skinner and Stremme lost control of their cars during qualifying, and Crafton's engine failed at the conclusion of his second timed lap. After the qualifier Johnson said, "I had a talk with myself to do what I could today and don't freak out if it's not as good as what Mark [Martin] ran. I kept my emotions in check and drove the car with the right touch and feel, and that comes from being relaxed, so it went well."

On Saturday morning, Martin was fastest with a time of 32.109 seconds in the second practice session, ahead of Denny Hamlin in second, and Johnson in third. Newman was fourth quickest, and Kyle Busch took fifth. Jeff Burton managed sixth. Biffle, Kasey Kahne, Joey Logano and Martin Truex Jr. followed in the top ten. Of the other drivers in the Chase, Jeff Gordon finished with the seventeenth fastest time, while Stewart set the twenty-fourth fastest time. Erik Darnell damaged his car's right-hand side against the barrier. Burton paced the final practice session with a 32.582 seconds lap, with Harvick and Martin second and third respectively. Truex was fourth fastest, ahead of Newman and Logano. Johnson was scored seventh, Casey Mears eighth, Brad Keselowski ninth and Hamlin tenth. The other Chase drivers, Jeff Gordon and Kurt Busch were scored fifteenth and eleventh respectively.

Qualifying results

Race 

The race, the last in the 2009 season, began at 3:15 pm Eastern Daylight Time and was televised live in the United States on ABC. Commentary was provided by Dale Jarrett, Andy Petree and Jerry Punch. Around the start of the race, weather conditions were partly cloudy with the air temperature . Fidel Gomez, assistant pastor of Calvary Chapel Fort Lauderdale in Fort Lauderdale, Florida, began pre-race ceremonies with an invocation. Actress Anika Noni Rose performed the national anthem, and actor Mike Rowe commanded the drivers to start their engines. During the pace laps, Robby Gordon had to move to the back of the grid because of him changing his engine.

Johnson retained his pole position lead into the first corner, with Speed behind him. The five points Johnson received for leading a single lap meant he now had to finish 27th or higher to win the Drivers' Championship. Two laps later, Harvick had moved into fourth position; Jamie McMurray, who began the race in eleventh, had moved up four positions to seventh place. By lap six, Ambrose began to reduce the lead of Johnson, and Martin got loose on the same lap but regained control of his car. On lap ten, Stewart passed Martin for fourth. Ambrose overtook Johnson on the outside to become the new race leader on the same lap. On lap 13, Johnson retook the lead off Ambrose. After having made three positions early, Harvick moved up into second position by passing Ambrose. On lap 16, Ambrose's car suffered a flat tire and came into the pit road.

Earnhardt who began the race in thirty-second, had moved up nineteen positions to thirteenth by lap 24. Two laps later, Ambrose began to slow and made a pit stop three laps later to change his car's battery. On lap 33, Stewart passed Johnson to become the new race leader while Ambrose entered his garage. Three laps later, Earnhardt had passed McMurray for tenth position. On lap 39, Clint Bowyer passed Martin for fourth position, as Ambrose rejoined the race four laps later. On lap 47, Kurt Busch passed Martin to claim sixth position. Three laps later, green flag pit stops began, as Matt Kenseth and Martin were the first to pit. Johnson made his pit stop one lap later.

On lap 53, Kurt Busch became the new race leader after Stewart came into his pit stall. One lap later, Kurt Busch came onto pit road and Bowyer became the new race leader. On lap 57, Harvick passed Bowyer to clinch the lead. Two laps later, Bowyer moved into second position by passing Stewart. Four laps later, Stewart reclaimed the lead after passing Harvick. On lap 64, Johnson passed Martin to move into ninth. By lap 73, Stewart had a 2.4 second lead over Harvick. One lap later, Newman collided with the wall, falling to eleventh place, and escaped with minor damage. On the 79th lap, Truex moved into seventh after passing Jeff Gordon. Two laps later, Ambrose spun at turn four but avoided contact with the barriers, causing the first caution of the race, and the pace car came out on track. During the caution, most of the leaders made pit stops. 
 
Stewart maintained his lead on the restart on lap 86, but Harvick reclaimed the lead immediately afterward, and Stewart was passed by Bowyer for second. One lap later, Stewart dropped to sixth as he was passed by Johnson, Montoya and Kurt Busch. On lap 89, Montoya passed Kurt Busch to move into fourth position. Two laps later, Montoya moved into third position after passing Johnson. On lap 92, Montoya passed Bowyer for second,  as Burton moved into third. Three laps later, Kurt Busch moved into sixth after passing Johnson. On lap 101, John Andretti collided with the wall, causing the second caution of the race. As with the first caution, most of the leaders made their pit stops.

Harvick maintained his lead on the restart on the 106th lap. Three laps later, Ambrose collided with the wall which prompted the third caution. Most of the drivers stayed on track during the caution, allowing Harvick to remain the leader on the restart that happened on lap 113. A collision involving Montoya and Stewart occurred on lap 116 and the third caution was given as a result. Harvick led on the lap 124-restart, although he was passed by Kurt Busch within eleven laps. By lap 143, Kurt Busch had a 1.5 second lead over Harvick. Two laps later, Hamlin passed Harvick to claim second. On lap 156, Montoya made rear-end contact with Stewart, sending the latter into the inside retaining barrier, because he was angered by Stewart making contact with him that necessitated repairs earlier in the race. The accident prompted the fifth caution. During the caution, all of the leaders made pit stops and Montoya was black-flagged for two laps. On lap 158, Hamlin reclaimed the lead, followed by Kurt Busch and Burton.

On lap 165, Johnson moved into seventh. Afterward, Johnson passed Jeff Gordon for sixth position. Seven laps later, Kurt Busch reclaimed the lead off Hamlin. During the 184th lap, Burton passed Hamlin for second. Ten laps later, a sixth caution came out as Robby Gordon spun sideways. All leading cars made pit stops, with Hamlin maintaining his lead until Burton passed him on the restart.  By lap 205, Burton had a lead of over two seconds. On lap 217, debris was spotted on the track and the seventh and final caution was prompted. The lead drivers made their pit stops. One lap later, Michael Waltrip became the new leader, followed by Andretti. Kurt Busch regained the lead one lap later, when Waltrip and Andretti made their pit stops. Kyle Busch immediately passed Kurt Busch on the restart for the lead on the 222nd lap. One lap later, Hamlin reclaimed the lead off Kyle Busch.

On lap 229, Jeff Gordon passed Johnson for the seventh position. Seven laps later, Martin moved into twelfth. After 247 laps, Hamlin's lead over Kyle Busch was 2.3  seconds. During the 249th lap, Edwards passed Bowyer for eighth. Six laps later, Kurt Busch passed Kyle Busch for third, and Kyle Busch lost fourth place to Johnson on lap 256. Hamlin maintained the lead to win his fourth race of the 2009 season, his second in the Chase for the Sprint Cup, and the eighth of his career. Burton finished second, ahead of Harvick and Kurt Busch. Johnson, who finished fifth, became the first driver to clinch four consecutive Drivers' Championships, overtaking Cale Yarborough's streak of three successive titles from 1976 to 1978. Gordon,  Edwards, Kyle Busch, Truex and A. J. Allmendinger rounded out the top ten finishers. There were eighteen lead changes among ten different drivers over the course of the event. Hamlin led three times for a total of 71 laps, more than any other driver.

Post-race 

Hamlin appeared in victory lane to start celebrating his fourth win of the season in front of 70,000 who attended the race. Hamlin also earned $347,975 in race winnings. After winning the race, Hamlin described his disappointment by saying, "The car took off and it was game-over, Everyone's got a little fight in them, especially when they get done wrong. After our performance today, it's easy to put yesterday behind me."

Afterward, Johnson began celebrating his fourth consecutive Sprint Cup Series championship, and was congratulated by Martin. During the celebration, Johnson said he was delighted with his performance, "The truth of it is, to do something that's never been done in this sport – to love the sport like I do and respect it like I do – and the greats: Petty, Earnhardt, Gordon ... to do something they've never done is so awesome. To win four championships in eight years, what this team has done ... I don't know where to start. It's unbelievable." Burton, who finished second, commended Johnson's achievements saying, "It’s hard to say he’s the best when you’re out there racing against him, but you have to put him on the list.” Martin, who finished second in points, said,

Following the race, both Montoya and Stewart made no comment on their collisions. Darian Grubb, Stewart's crew chief, apologized to Montoya's crew chief Brian Pattie for the accident. Pattie said that he did not foresee the crash, adding, "It shows you that (Montoya) is not going to be pushed around. But it didn't help us, and it didn't help (Stewart)." Grubb commented, "I haven't seen all the replays and I don't know what happened first and when. They were racing each other pretty hard and both got frustrated."

In the Drivers' Championship, Johnson finished first with 6,652 points, one-hundred and forty one ahead of Martin in second. Jeff Gordon followed in third with 6,473. Kurt Busch and Hamlin rounded out the top five positions with 6,446 and 6,335 points respectively. In the Manufacturers' Championship, Chevrolet won with 262 points, fifty-five ahead of Toyota and ninety-eight ahead of Ford. Dodge finished fourth with 159 points. 5.60 million people watched the race on television. The race took three hours, six minutes and eighteen seconds to complete, and the margin of victory was 2.632 seconds.

Race results

Standings after the race 

Note: Only the top twelve positions are included for the driver standings. These drivers qualified for the Chase for the Sprint Cup.

References 

Ford 400
Ford 400
NASCAR races at Homestead-Miami Speedway
November 2009 sports events in the United States